Guang'an is a prefecture-level city in eastern Sichuan province. It is most famous as the birthplace of China's former paramount leader Deng Xiaoping. Guang'an lies between the hills of central Sichuan and the gorges area of the east.Guang'an is the only "Sichuan Chongqing Cooperation Demonstration Zone" in Sichuan and the nearest prefecture level city from the main city of Chongqing. It has been incorporated into the 1 hour economic circle of Chongqing. Because of its strategic location, it is called the "Gateway to Eastern Sichuan". Its population as of 2020 census was 3,254,883, of whom 976,370 lived in the built-up (or metro) area made of 2 urban districts.

Geography and climate
Guang'an is located on a gradually rising section along the edge of the Sichuan Basin. The eastern part of Guang'an is mountainous, the central part hilly, and the western part is relatively flat. The elevation ranges from only 185 to 1704 meters above sea-level. The main rivers are the Qu through the center of the area and the Jialing through the west.

The climate is temperate and the weather is monsoonal. Winters are mild and summers are hot. The frost-free period lasts 310–324 days. Winter and spring have relatively little rain while in summer there are heavy rain showers. Autumns have almost constant rain and light wind.

Administration
Guang'an city has 1 (sub)city, 3 counties, 87 towns, and 2886 villages within it, a total population of 3,205,476 in 2010 census.  None of the districts are urban in character as of 2010, nevertheless, large scale dense urban building projects and even urban rapid transit are nearing completion as of 2019, remaking the urbanscape entirely, and 2010 census data relegated to dated and unreliable.

Transport
The city lies on the north-south China National Highway 212.

A , seven station monorail is under construction as part of the planned two line Guang'an Metro.  The first line was due to open in 2020 but testing has been delayed and as of June 2021 the line is still now open.

Economy
Guang'an's economy is natural resource based. Mineral resources are plentiful and the soil is ideal for agriculture.

Tourism
Chinese leader Deng Xiaoping's birthplace and former residence museum is located in Paifang village in Xiexing town. Guang'an also has beautiful natural scenery including many mountains and gorges designated as parks.

References

 
Cities in Sichuan
Prefecture-level divisions of Sichuan